Ecologists Association (Associazione Ecologisti) was a small green and eco-socialist association in Italy.

It was founded in November 2009 by those members of the Federation of the Greens who wanted to continue the experience of Left and Freedom (SL), a left-wing coalition that was abandoned by the Greens in October, and took part to the foundation of Left Ecology Freedom (SEL) as a united party. Initially, the Ecologists were a minority faction within the Federation. Subsequently, they left the Greens to join Left Ecology Freedom.

Leadership
Spokesperson: Loredana De Petris

References

2009 establishments in Italy
Defunct socialist parties in Italy
Defunct political parties in Italy
Green political parties in Italy
Political parties established in 2009
Political parties disestablished in 2010